The blue-gray gnatcatcher or blue-grey gnatcatcher (Polioptila caerulea) is a very small songbird native to North America.

Description
Adult males are blue-gray on the upperparts with white underparts, slender dark bill, and a long black tail edged in white. Females are less blue, while juveniles are greenish-gray. Both sexes have a white eye ring.

Distribution and habitat
The blue-gray gnatcatcher's breeding habitat includes open deciduous woods and shrublands in southern Ontario, the eastern and southwestern United States, and Mexico. Though gnatcatcher species are common and increasing in number while expanding to the northeast, it is the only one to breed in Eastern North America. They migrate to the southern United States, Mexico, northern Central America (Belize, Guatemala, and Honduras), Cuba, the Bahamas, the Turks and Caicos Islands, and the Cayman Islands.

Diet and behaviour
These birds prefer humid areas with large leaves, woodlands, and more open sandy areas with sparse trees where they mainly eat insects, insect eggs, and spiders. The males often work to build nests, help incubate and raise the young, as well as feed the children, often thought to be a mother's role. Their nests are often built far out on a tree's branch with spider silks and lichen plants holding them together. They may hover over foliage while snatching prey (gleaning), or fly to catch insects in flight (hawking). The tail is often held upright while defending territory or searching for food.

Sounds

The songs (and calls) are often heard on breeding grounds, (usually away from nest) and occasionally heard other times of the year. Calls: "zkreee, zkreee, zkreee", Songs: "szpree zpree spreeeeey spree spre sprzrreeeee"

Breeding
Both parents build a cone-like nest on a horizontal tree branch, and share feeding the young. The incubation period is 10-15 days for both sexes, and two broods may be raised in a season.

References

External links

 Blue-gray gnatcatcher - Polioptila caerula - USGS Patuxent Bird Identification InfoCenter
 Blue-grey gnatcatcher stamps from Turks and Caicos at bird-stamps.org
 
 
 Blue-gray gnatcatcher Bird Sound at Florida Museum of Natural History
 
 
 
 

blue-gray gnatcatcher
Native birds of Eastern Canada
Birds of the United States
Birds of Central America
Birds of the Caribbean
blue-gray gnatcatcher
Taxa named by Carl Linnaeus